TYT Türk  was a short-lived television channel broadcast in Texs Medya. The channel included news, sport, entertainment, movies, and television series. The channel broadcast in 4K format. TYT Türk broadcasting ceased on 24 March 2020.

History

TYT Türk was planned in 2017. TYT Türk started broadcasting was expected for 18 November 2018. However, broadcasting was not yet started. On 1 August 2019, TYT Türk began test broadcasting. On 5 August 2019, the channel's satellite broadcasting officially started. When TYT Türk reached its advertising level, D-Smart, Digitürk, Türksat Kablo TV, Turkcell TV+, Vodafone TV, Tivibu, TYT Haber, and IPTV would come on the new HD broadcast platform. However, TYT Türk's advertising level did not reach and the aforementioned brands did not come.

On 27 November 2019, TYT Türk discontinued its television broadcasting due to an economical crisis. TYT Türk was discontinued in Türksat satellite due to advertisement level being left unreached. After the channel's closure, it was announced that the sales option of TYT Türk was also evaluated. It was stated that the channel sold more than 5.5 million TL with the frequency right and technical material. While it is not known whether there was a buyer on the channel, it would be clear whether the sale would be in the future and whether the channel could be closed completely. While wondering what would be the situation of 80 employees working on the channel, it was announced that the channel would reach the audience for a while, but would not produce any new productions and would not broadcast live. TYT Türk would later lay off 80 employees.

As of 24 March 2020, TYT Türk ended TV live streaming with internet.

Programs

TV Programs

 Sen Olsan
 Serbest Vuruş
 Mahmut Şahin’le Haklı Sorular
 Türkan VAROL’la Ana Haber
 Öykü CENGİZ’le Bu Sabah
 Pınar ERGÜNER’le Hafta Sonu
 Hafta Sonu Ana Haber
 Nasıl Yani
 Cemal Dursun ile Gönül Kapısı
 Ebru Keser’le Hayatın Tadı
 Seda AKBAY’la Ekonomi Meydanı
 Super Cup

TV Series

 The X-Files
 Emret Komutanım
 Kızlar Yurdu

Movies

 Türk Sinema Kuşağı
 Yabancı Sinema Kuşağı
 Western Sinema Kuşağı

TYT Family

TYT Family was owned by Texs Medya.

References

Defunct television channels in Turkey
Turkish-language television stations
Television channels and stations established in 2019
Television channels and stations disestablished in 2019
2019 establishments in Turkey
2020 disestablishments in Turkey
4K television channels